The equestrian events at the 1952 Helsinki Summer Olympics included dressage, eventing, and show jumping. All three disciplines had both individual and team competitions and were held from 28 July to 3 August 1952.

One of the biggest changes at the 1952 Olympics was the demographics of competitors. Before this, most of the riders were officers (41 of 44 starters at the 1948 Olympics were riding in uniform), whereas the Helsinki Games saw over 50% of competitors from the civilian ranks. Additionally, women were now allowed to compete for the first time in equestrian events. At the 1952 Games, they were permitted in the dressage competition, although prohibited from the jumping (per a ruling in 1951) and most definitely not in eventing which was considered too dangerous. A total of 4 women competed out of 134 riders.

25 nations competed: Argentina, Brazil, Bulgaria, Canada, Chile, Denmark, Egypt, Finland, France, Federal Republic of Germany, Great Britain, Ireland, Italy, Japan, Korea, Mexico, the Netherlands, Norway, Portugal, Romania, Soviet Union, Spain, Sweden, Switzerland, and the USA. This was the first appearance for Canada, Egypt, Korea, and the Soviet Union. Russia had sent riders to the 1912 Games, but had not competed since. The youngest participant was Walter Staley (19) from the United States, while the oldest rider was the Danish Kristian Jensen (63).

Disciplines

Show jumping
52 riders from 20 nations competed at the 1952 Games. For the first time, individual and team medals were awarded based on a two-round Prix des Nations (Nations Cup). 16 teams rode around Björn Strandell's 786 meter course with a 1 min 57.2 second time allowed and fences up to 1.60 meters in height and a 5-meter water jump. The individual gold was won by the French rider Pierre d'Oriola, aboard the gelding, Ali Baba. D'Oriola would repeat the feat in 1964 and remains the only rider to win two gold medals in this discipline. The team event was won by Great Britain, anchored by a clear round for Harry Llewellyn and Foxhunter. This gold medal, attained on the last day of competition, was Great Britain's only gold of the 1952 Games. They remain the only nation to have won gold medals in every Summer Olympics since 1896.

Dressage

27 riders, including for the first time 4 women, from 10 nations rode in the dressage competition. One of these women was Denmark's Lis Hartel, who in 1944, at age 23, had been paralyzed by polio. She gradually regained muscle function but remained paralyzed below the knee. Amazingly, despite not being able to mount or dismount unassisted, she won individual silver.

5 judges were present at the test, with the lowest and highest scores of the panel being dropped (the only time in Olympic dressage history this method was used). The test reintroduction of the piaffe and passage, and was 15 minutes in length.

Eventing
The eventing competition was slightly harder in 1952 than in 1948. Phase A was 7 km at 240m/min, Phase B (steeplechase) was 4 km at 600m/min, Phase C 15 km at 240 m/min, Phase D (cross-country) was 9 km at 450 m/min with jumping efforts up to 1.20 meters, followed by the final phase which was a 2 km "gallop" at 333m/min. The final stadium jumping round also had fences up to 1.20 meters.

59 riders from 21 countries competed, forming 19 teams. 13 of those teams were strictly officers, while 2 were a mix of officers and civilians (Great Britain and Ireland) and four had civilian-only teams (Canada, Germany, the Netherlands, and the USA). Of the 12 medals awarded between the individual and team competitions, 7 went to civilians.

Medal summary

Medal table

Officials
Appointment of officials was as follows:

Dressage
  Max Thommen (Ground Jury President)
  Idzard Sirtema van Grovestins (Ground Jury Member)
  Claës König (Ground Jury Member)
  Challan Belval (Ground Jury Member)
  Maj. Hanoteau (Ground Jury Member)

Jumping
  Ake Wahlroos (Ground Jury President)
  Arne Francke (Ground Jury Member)
  Henri von der Weid (Ground Jury Member)
  Earl F. Thomson (Ground Jury Member)
  José M. Cavanillas (Ground Jury Member)
  Björn Strandell (Course Designer)

Eventing
  Ranieri di Campello (Ground Jury President)
  Arthur Kalita (Ground Jury Member)
  V.D.S. Williams (Ground Jury Member)
  José M. Cavanillas (Ground Jury Member)
  Arne Kristensen (Ground Jury Member)
  Björn Strandell (Course Designer)

References

External links
 International Olympic Committee medal database

 
1952 Summer Olympics events
1952